Qeshlaq-e Qobad (also Romanized as Qeshlāq-e Qobād) is a village in Tork-e Sharqi Rural District, Jowkar District, Malayer County, Hamadan Province, Iran. At the 2006 census, its population was 48, in 11 families.

References 

Populated places in Malayer County